The FK Viktoria Stadion, officially named the eFotbal Arena, is a multi-use stadium in Prague, Czech Republic. It is used mostly for football matches and is the home ground of FK Viktoria Žižkov. The stadium holds 5,037 people, all seated. In 2007 the club opened a shop at the stadium for the sale of club merchandise. A new playing surface was laid in 2011 after the club was promoted to the Czech First League, one of the conditions of the club's acceptance into the league.

Transport
The stadium is located close to Viktoria Žižkov tram stop, which is served by tram services 5, 9, 15 and 26. It was renamed in December 2021 and was previously known as Husinecká

References

External links
 Photo gallery and data at Erlebnis-stadion.de

Czech First League venues
Football venues in Prague
FK Viktoria Žižkov
Sports venues completed in 1952
Žižkov
European League of Football venues
1952 establishments in Czechoslovakia
20th-century architecture in the Czech Republic